Tamil Nadu National Law University (TNNLU), formerly Tamil Nadu National Law School (TNNLS), is a National Law University . Admissions to the university are done on the basis of the Common Law Admission Test. It was established in 2012 by the Government of Tamil Nadu through Tamil Nadu National Law School Act, 2012, with an initial contribution of .The Act was amended in the year 2018 and the word 'School' was replaced by the word ' University'.

TNNLU is located on a 25-acre campus in the Tiruchirappalli-Dindigul NH 45, at Navalurkuttappattu Village, about 12 kilometres from Tiruchirappalli Railway Junction / Central Bus Stand.

Tiruchirappalli, known as Rock Fort City, is well connected by road, rail and air. Trichy has daily flights from Chennai, Bangalore, Mumbai and Kochi. Madurai, a well-connected airport, is an hour and a half by road from TNNLU.

TNNLU is located about 10 kilometres from District and Sessions Court and other Sub-ordinate Courts, thus facilitating easy and effective interaction between the TNNLU and the Bar.

TNNLU has been established with the following laudable objectives:

(i) to advance and disseminate learning and knowledge of the law and legal processes and their role in national development;

(ii) to develop in the students and research scholars a sense of responsibility to serve society in the field of law by developing skills with regard to advocacy, legal services, legislation, law reforms and the like;

(iii) to organize lectures, seminars, symposia and conferences to promote legal knowledge and to make law and legal processes efficient instruments of social development;

(iv) to hold examinations and confer degrees and other academic distinctions and to do all such things as are incidental, necessary or conducive to the attainment of all or any of the objectives of the University.

TNNLU commenced its functioning in the academic year 2013-2014. The TNNLU offers two undergraduate programmes, viz., B.A. LL.B., (Hons.) and B.Com. LL.B., (Hons.). Admission to the courses is on the basis of marks scored in the Common Law Admission Test (CLAT).

Extensive infrastructural facilities, with separate buildings for Administration, Academic activities, Examination, a Library and hall of Residence for Men and Women, an auditorium, staff quarters and a Guest House are available on the campus.

The University Grants Commission has included TNNLU in the approved list of Universities. The Bar Council of India has granted recognition to TNNLU as a Center for Legal Education. UGC has included TNNLU under section 12(B) of the UGC Act 1956, which will enable TNNLU to apply for grants from UGC and other Central Government Funding Agencies TNNLU is a member of the Association of Indian Universities (AIU).

TNNLU is a member of the Shastri Indo- Canadian Institute and it is a permanent member of the Indian Academy of Social Sciences. TNNLU is also an empanelled institution with the Competition Commission of India.

MISSION:
To impart quality legal education nurtured within a robust culture of interdisciplinary research and teaching in an equitable, respectful and supportive environment producing legal practitioners and scholars who will be committed to justice, social transformation and national development.

VISION:
To achieve global recognition as an institution of eminence and excellence in all spheres of legal education, rooted in an interdisciplinary approach to the study of law, such that the graduates of TNNLU will be independent, critical thinkers and socially responsible human beings.

References

External links
 

National Law Universities
Law schools in Tamil Nadu
Universities and colleges in Tiruchirappalli
Educational institutions established in 2012
2012 establishments in Tamil Nadu